Saint Regis Falls Central School is a school in Franklin County, New York, that serves grades Pre-K to Grade 12. The Superintendent is Dr. Nicole G Eschler, and the Principals are Danielle Emburey and Wendie Boucher. The school is located in the hamlet of St. Regis Falls within the town of Waverly, and serves the towns of Dickinson, Hopkinton, Lawrence, Santa Clara and Waverly.

History

Selected former superintendents
Mrs. Patricia Dovi
Mr. Michael A. Hunsinger–?-1986 (Named Superintendent of Waterloo Central School District)
Mr. Ernest L. Witkowski
Mr. Michael Valley–?-2002

Selected former principals
Mr. Boyd McKendrick
Mr. Kenneth Davison
Mr. Philip L. Snyder–2002-2003
Mr. Terry B. Remington–2003-2005
Mr. Richard N. Hansen–2005--2007

References

External links
Official Website

School districts in New York (state)
Schools in Franklin County, New York
Public high schools in New York (state)
Public middle schools in New York (state)
Public elementary schools in New York (state)